Shamal Tyrell George (born 6 January 1998) is an English professional footballer who plays as a goalkeeper for Scottish Premiership side Livingston.

Career

Liverpool 
Born in Birkenhead, George signed for Liverpool in 2009 after playing for Manor. He joined Liverpool's first team in the summer of 2016 for pre-season, appearing out of position as a striker in a friendly match against Huddersfield Town, after Liverpool manager Jürgen Klopp had used all the remaining substitutes.

He then immediately joined Carlisle United on loan to gain first-team experience. He made his professional debut on 29 August 2017 in an EFL Trophy match, and made his Football League debut for the club on 12 September in a match against Coventry City.

In July 2018 he signed an extension to his contract with Liverpool, and joined Tranmere Rovers on loan until January 2019. In March 2019, George and his brother were attacked outside a bar in Liverpool. 

On 31 August 2019, he was loaned to Marine He returned to Liverpool in January 2020 on completion of his loan, having made 16 appearances for Marine.

He was released by Liverpool at the end of the 2019–20 season.

Colchester United 
On 28 August 2020, George signed for League Two club Colchester United on a two year deal. He made his Colchester debut in their 2–0 EFL Trophy defeat to Portsmouth on 8 September. He made his league debut for the club as a substitute for Dean Gerken in Colchester's 1–0 home defeat to Scunthorpe United on 29 January 2021. On 3 May 2022, George was named the Colchester United Player of the Year for the 2021–22 season, also winning the CUSA Player of the Year Award. The club exercised a contract extension for George in May 2022.

Livingston 
On 23 July 2022, George signed for Scottish Premiership side Livingston for an undisclosed fee, and was introduced to Livingston fans ahead of their Scottish League Cup match against Kelty Hearts the same day.

Career statistics

Honours
Individual
Colchester United Player of the Year: 2021–22

References

Living people
1998 births
Black British sportspeople
English footballers
Sportspeople from Birkenhead
Association football goalkeepers
Liverpool F.C. players
Carlisle United F.C. players
Tranmere Rovers F.C. players
Marine F.C. players
Livingston F.C. players
Colchester United F.C. players
English Football League players
Northern Premier League players
Scottish Professional Football League players